Girolamo Bellavista (22 November 1908 – 28 April 1976) was an Italian politician belonging to the Italian Liberal Party. In 1946 he was elected member of the Constituent Assembly of Italy. 

Bellavista was born in Palermo.  In 1948 he was elected a member of the Chamber of Deputies.

References

1908 births
1976 deaths
Politicians from Palermo
Italian Liberal Party politicians
Members of the Constituent Assembly of Italy
Deputies of Legislature I of Italy